Recitation is the fifth album from Envy. Recitation continues to expand upon the band's previous albums by using further elements of post-rock and spoken word while also maintaining screamed vocals, and is often seen as an album of further growth for Envy that improves upon the predecessors by perfecting their mix of screamo, hardcore punk and post-rock. They also continue to use Japanese lyrics. It is the only Envy release to feature no clean singing, only screaming and spoken word.

Track listing

Personnel
Dairoku Seki - Drums
Tetsuya Fukagawa - Sequencer, Vocals
Nobukata Kawai - Guitar
Masahiro Tobita - Guitar
Manabu Nakagawa - Bass Guitar
Takashi Kitaguchi - Recording, Mixing

References

2010 albums
Envy (band) albums